Temkino is a rural locality (a village) in Slednevskoye Rural Settlement, Alexandrovsky District, Vladimir Oblast, Russia. The population was 20 as of 2010. There are 4 streets.

Geography 
Temkino is located on the Seraya River, 12 km northeast of Alexandrov (the district's administrative centre) by road. Svinkino is the nearest rural locality.

References 

Rural localities in Alexandrovsky District, Vladimir Oblast